This is a list of industrial accidents and incidents that have resulted in environmental damage and/or has resulted in death or major injury that have occurred within the fossil fuel industry in Australia, in either the extraction, mining, processing or transporting phases.

 Oil tanker Oceanic Grandeur oil spill – 1970
 Box Flat Mine explosion resulting in the death of 17 miners – 1972
 Bulk coal tanker Sygna oil spill – 1974
 Oil tanker Princess Anne Marie oil spill – 1975
Kianga coal mine explosion – 1975
 Oil tanker World Encouragement oil spill – 1979
 Appin coal mine explosion resulting in the death of 14 miners – 1979
 Oil tanker Esso Gippsland oil spill – 1982
Moura coal mine roof fall and explosion – 1986
Collinsville Coal Roof collapse in mine shaft – 1988
 Crude oil tanker Arthur Phillip oil spill – 1990
Oakleigh Number Three Colliery roof collapse resulting in death of a miner – 1990
Newlands coal mine gas explosion resulting in death of miner – 1990
Goonyella-Riverside coal mine outrush of coal and water – 1991
 South Bulli coal mine incident resulting in the death of 3 miners – 1991
 Western Main coal mine Pillar Collapse resulting in the death of 3 miners – 1991
Moura Open Cut coal mine incident resulting in death of 2 miners and serious injury to 2 others – 1993
 Oil tanker Kirki oil spill – 1991
 Moura coal mine explosion – 1994
 Xstrata's Oaky Creek coal mine, miner lost his life when vehicle was driven over the edge of the excavation due to the substandard condition of the workplace – 1996
 Laleham No1 coal mine, miner pinned between machinery resulting in death of miner – 1996
 Gretley coal mine disaster resulting in the death of 4 miners – 1996
 Newhill coal mine, rib collapse causing death to miner – 1997
 BHP's Blackwater Open Cut coal mine, vehicle incident resulting in death of miner – 1997
 Esso Longford gas plant explosion – 1998
 Mobil Port Stanvac Refinery oil spill – 1999
 Varanus Island Terminal oil spill – 1999
 Oil tanker Laura D'Amato oil spill – 1999
 Oil carrier Sylvan Arrow oil spill – 1999
 Cook coal mine coal dislodged resulting in death of miner – 2000
 Jellinabah Open Cut Coal incident causing severe crush injuries to miner – 2000
 Oaky coal mine roof fall causing death to miner – 2000
 Goonyella Riverside coal mine experienced a major structural failure resulting in serious injury to a miner – 2000
 Bulk carrier Global Peace oil spill at RG Tanner Coal loading facility in Gladstone in Queensland – 2006
 Yallourn Power Station Coal mine wall collapse (mine flooded by the Latrobe River) – 2007
 Venus Island gas pipeline explosion – 2008
 Santos Limited Port Bonython groundwater contamination (Crude oil leak from storage tanks enter the groundwater) – 2008–2012
 Montara Well Head Platform blowout and subsequent oil and gas spill – 2009
 Eastern Star Gas (taken over by Santos Ltd) Coal Stream Gas operation incident which resulted in 10,000 litres of toxic water waste entering the environment in the Pilliga State Forest – 2011
 Princess Highway closed after heavy resulted in land movement at the Hazelwood mine causing cracks in the road – 2011
 Springvale and Angus Place coal mines – Undertook unapproved coal mining and/or discharging mine groundwater into an environmentally sensitive area – 2011
 Collapse of the Morwell River Diversion at the Yallourn Coal Mine – 2012
 Santos Limited Jackson oil spill – 2013

See also
 Mining accidents in Australia

References

External links
Department of Natural Resources and Mines, Queensland government, Mining wardens inquiries
 Australian Maritime Safety Authority Major historical incidents
 The Australian Emergency Management Knowledge Hub - Industrial
 Case judgements from the Environmental Protection and Biodiversity Conservation Act - Department of the Environment

Lists of disasters in Australia
Accidents in the fossil fuel industry
Accidents in the fossil fuel industry in Australia